Heathfield is an English surname. Notable people with this surname include the following:

 Adrian Heathfield, English writer, son of Peter and Betty
 Betty Heathfield (1927–2006), English left-wing activist, wife of Peter
 Donald Heathfield, KGB agent
 Peter Heathfield (1929–2010), English trade unionist, husband of Betty
 Simon Heathfield (born 1967), British Anglican priest
 Tom Heathfield, British cricketer

Other
Baron Heathfield, British title, created in 1787
Thomas Heathfield Carrick (1802–1874), English portrait miniature painter

English-language surnames